Tellini may refer to:

People
Enrico Tellini, Italian General whose assassination was linked to the Corfu Incident.
Piero Tellini, Italian screenwriter

Other
Tellini Affair, a term used to refer to the Corfu incident.